Salomon Juan Marcos Issa (born July 5, 1948 in Torreón, Coahuila) is a Mexican politician. Currently is federal congressman in the  LXII Legislature of the Mexican Congress. Also has been municipal president of Torreón in Coahuila during 2000 to 2002.

Biography 
Second child of businessman Antonio Juan Marcos and his wife Issa Habib. He studied licenciature in Business Management in the Autonomous University of Coahuila. He is marriedn with Rocío Villarreal Asúnsolo and has three children: Salomón, Antonio y Rocío. Juan Marcos has stood out as businessman in denim manufacturing industry.

His political activity started in 1996, when he was candidate to be municipal presidente (Mayor) of Torreón but it was defeated by Jorge Zermeño Infante of the (PAN) in that chance.

Between 2000 and 2002 he was elected as mayor of Torreón. Before that, between 2003 and 2005, was representative in Coahuila's Congress. During 2006 was candidate to Senator. In Mexican general election in 2012 he gained a seat in the Chamber of Deputies as representative of Coahuila.

See also
Antonio Juan Marcos Villarreal

References

External links 
Ficha del legislador. Salomón Juan Marcos Issa

1948 births
Members of the Chamber of Deputies (Mexico) for Coahuila
Living people
Politicians from Torreón
Institutional Revolutionary Party politicians
Jeans
21st-century Mexican politicians
Mexican people of Arab descent
Autonomous University of Coahuila alumni
Members of the Congress of Coahuila
Municipal presidents of Torreón
Deputies of the LXII Legislature of Mexico